Desmia naclialis is a moth in the family Crambidae. It is found in Colombia.

References

Moths described in 1875
Desmia
Moths of South America